Sweet Sixteen is the fifteenth studio album by American country music singer Reba McEntire, released on May 1, 1989 by MCA Records. Four singles from the album entered the Billboard country charts: the number one hit "Cathy's Clown" (a cover version of The Everly Brothers' song), top 5 hit "Walk On", and the top ten hits "'Til Love Comes Again" and "Little Girl". Sweet Sixteen was her penultimate album with record producer Jimmy Bowen. Reba Live would be her last.

The album's title derives from its being McEntire's sixteenth album, counting compilation and Christmas albums.

The album was certified Platinum by the RIAA, for selling over 1 million copies. The album debuted at #17 on the Country Albums chart for the week of May 27, 1989, and peaked at #1 for the week of June 24, 1989. It stayed at #1 for 13 consecutive weeks. The album sold over 500,000 copies in its first 9 weeks.

Track listing

Personnel 
Adapted from the album liner notes.

 Reba McEntire – lead and harmony vocals
 Bill Payne – pianos
 Mike Lawler – synthesizers
 Brent Rowan – electric guitar
 Michael Thomas – electric guitar
 Billy Joe Walker Jr. – electric guitar, acoustic guitar
 Jerry Douglas – dobro
 Donnie LaValley – steel guitar, lap steel guitar
 Glen Duncan – fiddle, mandolin
 Leland Sklar – bass guitar
 Eddie Bayers – drums
 Russ Kunkel – drums
 Kirk Cappello – cabasa
 Joe McGlohon – saxophone
 Vince Gill – harmony vocals
 Suzi Hoskins-Wills – harmony vocals
 Dave Loggins – harmony vocals
 Patty Loveless – harmony vocals
 Judy Rodman – harmony vocals
 Steve Wariner – harmony vocals

Production 
 Jimmy Bowen – producer
 Reba McEntire – producer, pre-production, liner notes 
 Don Lanier – pre-production
 Bob Bullock – recording engineer, overdub recording 
 Tim Kish – overdub recording
 John S. Howell – second engineer 
 Marty Williams – second engineer
 John Guess – mixing 
 Milan Bogdan – digital editing 
 Glenn Meadows – mastering 
 Jessie Noble – project coordinator 
 Simon Levy – art direction 
 Mickey Braithwaite – design 
 Jim McGuire – photography

Studios 
 Recorded and Mixed at Emerald Sound Studios (Nashville, Tennessee).
 Mastered at Masterfonics (Nashville, Tennessee).

Charts

Weekly charts

Year-end charts

Singles

Certifications and sales

References

1989 albums
Reba McEntire albums
MCA Records albums
Albums produced by Jimmy Bowen